Would You Buy A Used War From This Man? A Collection of Political Humor From National Lampoon is a 1972 American humor book, a paperback anthology of pieces of political humor from National Lampoon magazine.

The "This Man" in the title was Richard Nixon, who was the President of the United States from 1969 to 1974, and the "War" in the title was the Vietnam War, which lasted from 1955 to 1975. The title was a variant of the American saying, "Would you buy a used car from this man?", meaning that the person was not someone you could trust, and that was obvious from the person's face. A Democratic Party poster campaign in the 1960 presidential election used the slogan "Would YOU buy a used car from this man?" together with a photo of Nixon, who later lost the election to John Kennedy.

The cartoonist Ed Sorel drew the cover illustration, which shows Nixon as a used car salesman leaning on a pile of blood-stained army uniforms, with a sign in the background with lettering that says "TRICKY DICKY" and "USED CARNAGE". The book was published by Warner-Paperback Library.

References

External links
 Listed here and cover shown 
 Amazon listing
 Alibris listing

National Lampoon books
1972 books